Kompakt: Total 10 or Total 10 was released on 10 August 2009. The album is the tenth installment of the Cologne-based microhouse label's annual compilation of vinyl releases and exclusives from its biggest artists and most promising newcomers.

Track listing

Disc One
 DJ Koze – "40 Love" (6:58)
 Thomas & Mayer – "Total 9" (6:27)
 Justus Köhncke – "(It’s Gonna Be) Alright (Dirk Leyers Remix)" (9:59)
 Shumi – "The Wind and the Sea" (7:33)
 Sam Taylor-Wood & Pet Shop Boys – "I’m In Love With a German Film Star (Gui Boratto Remix)" (7:25)
 Ada & Raz Ohara – "Lovestoned" (7:08)
 Coma  – "Sum" (7:23)
 Gui Boratto – "No Turning Back (Wighnomy Brothers Likkalize Love Rekksmi)" (7:15)
 Nicolas Stefan – "Closer" (7:01)
 Jonas Bering – "Who Is Who" (5:28)

Disc Two
 Justus Köhncke – "Give It to Me Easy" (8:23)
 Matias Aguayo – "Walter Neff" (5:49)
 Mayburg – "Each and Every Day (feat. Ada)" (5:12)
 Gotye – "Heart’s a Mess (Supermayer Remix)" (8:13)
 The Field – "The More I Do (Thomas Fehlmann Mix)” (8:02)
 Burger/Voigt – “Wand Aus Klang (It's a Fine Line Remix)” (9:15)
 Wasserman – "Berg und Tal (Instrumental)" (6:45)
 Jürgen Paape – "Ofterschwang" (4:33)
 Reinhard Voigt – "Am Limit" (7:30)
 Geoffroy Dewandeler & Oliver Grégoire – "Ignored Folklore" (6:25)
 Pachanga Boys – "Fiesta Forever" (4:14)

External links

2009 compilation albums
Kompakt compilation albums
Microhouse albums
Record label compilation albums